Remixed is the first remix album by Japanese electronica/rock duo Boom Boom Satellites. Initially scheduled for release on September 19, 2012, it contains remixes of songs from their 15-year-long career, including the American exclusive track "Kick It Out" featuring Tahj Mowry and Flo Rida (co-written by Marquist Johnson and Johnathan Perry) and the winning fan remix of their most recent single "Broken Mirror".

The release of Remixed was postponed by the band due to issues concerning the album artwork, as announced on their Facebook page. Amazon MP3 listings place the new release date at November 28, 2012. The album's artwork was later changed, announced on October 5, 2012, and the new release date for the album set at November 7, 2012.

Track listing

References

External links
 Boom Boom Satellites official website

2012 remix albums
Boom Boom Satellites albums
Gr8! Records albums